Trnje is a small settlement north of Velika Loka in the Municipality of Trebnje in eastern Slovenia. It lies on the northern side of the regional road leading from Trebnje to Šentlovrenc. The area is part of the historical region of Lower Carniola. The municipality is now included in the Southeast Slovenia Statistical Region.

References

External links
Trnje at Geopedia

Populated places in the Municipality of Trebnje